Minsk National Airport, formerly known as Minsk-2 , is the main international airport in Belarus, located 42 km (26 mi) to the east of the capital Minsk, geographically lying in the territory of Smalyavichy Raion but administratively being subordinated to Kastrychnitski District of Minsk. The airport serves as hub of the Belarusian flag carrier Belavia and the cargo carriers TAE Avia, Genex and Rubystar Airways.

History

Early years
Construction of Minsk-2 airport began in 1977. In 1979, a new runway 3,640-m-long and 60-m-wide became operational. By 1981 the Minsk-2 aerodrome was able to handle aircraft and the airport opened in 1982. The first passenger flight was operated with a Tupolev Tu-134.

On 1 July 1983, the Second Joint Aviation Division of Minsk was established in accordance with the decision of the Ministry of Civil Aviation of USSR. This date is considered as the airport foundation day.

Development since the 1990s
Regular flights began in 1983; by 1990 passenger traffic reached 2.2 million passengers. From 1991, the number of flights began to decline due to the dissolution of the Soviet Union and other consequent changes. By 1997, the number of the passengers was 516,000, in 1998 – 480,000, in 2000 – only 400,000 passengers.
Since the collapse of the Soviet Union, the first million passengers was handled by Minsk National Airport in 2008. Due to the substantial growth in passenger traffic, 2008 became a significant mark for the airport. In May 2019, a second runway, 13L/31R was opened.

In 2020, the growth was stalled by the COVID-19 pandemic in 2020. Additionally from May 2021 all Belarusian airlines, mainly Belavia, have been banned from operating into the European Union as part of newly established sanctions after the Ryanair Flight 4978 incident. Likewise, several European airlines cancelled their Minsk services over the conflict, e.g., Lufthansa.

On 9 August 2021, the US has added the airport director Vyacheslav Khoroneko to the SDN list.

Role in the 2021 border crisis
In 2021, the airport became a major hub for illegal migration to the European Union. It was reported that several fly-by-night companies and two travel agencies got full access to the international zone of the airport and started to offer agent services for arrived migrants issuing visas on arrival. It was noted that these companies enjoyed the patronage of the airport staff and authorities, while other travel agencies were not allowed to provide similar services for real tourists. 

The situation also affected airlines serving Belarus. Due to ongoing crisis Cham Wings Airlines terminated their flights from Damascus on short notice, stating they cannot distinguish between regular travellers and illegal migrants. In the same time, Turkish Airlines amongst others stopped selling tickets to Minsk to passengers with certain nationalities, e. g. from Yemen and Iraq after the European Union threatened sanctions against airlines which (unknowingly) participate in illegal migration. Belavia has also ceased ticket sales to certain nationals for flights from Turkish airports to Belarus upon the Turkish government's decision to support the European Union regarding the recent events. The same applies to all flights from Uzbekistan and Dubai, whose governments announced similar guidelines.

Terminal
Minsk National Airport consists of one slightly curved, four-story passenger terminal building originally built in the style of brutalist architecture, which has since been modernized and expanded. The ground floor features the arrivals area while the second floor consists of the check-in hall with 43 counters and 13 departure gates, some of which are equipped with jet bridges. The airside features the usual duty free shops, an airport lounge and other passenger amenities as well as a branch of Burger King. The first and third floors are mainly used for administration and maintenance.

Airlines and destinations
The following airlines operate regular scheduled and charter flights to and from Minsk:

Statistics

Ground transportation
The airport is located 42 km (26 mi) east of Minsk, and is linked with the city with a toll-free (for non-BY registered cars) highway. Free short term parking is available in front of the terminal. Minsk National Airport is linked to the capital by the M2 motorway. Bus, train, taxi and parking services are provided. The airport is served by buses 300Э and 173Э departing from Centralny bus station.

Incidents and accidents
 On 1 February 1985, Aeroflot Flight 7841, a Tu-134AK operated by Aeroflot with registration number SSSR-65910 en route to Leningrad Pulkovo airport, crashed into the forest shortly after takeoff, killing 55 out of 73 passengers and 3 out of 7 crew members on board.
 On 6 September 2003, an aircraft Tu-154 operated by an Iranian airline Kish Air hit trees in heavy fog as it was on approach en route from Tehran to Copenhagen. None of the 38 passengers and 4 crew members on board were injured.
 On 26 October 2009, S-Air Flight 9607, operated using a BAe 125 RA-02807 crashed on approach to Minsk National Airport. All three crew and both passengers died.
 On 23 May 2021, Ryanair Flight 4978, operated using a Boeing 737-8AS with 171 passengers on board, traveling in Belarusian airspace en route from Athens to Vilnius, was intercepted by a Belarusian MiG-29 over Belarusian airspace and forced to land at Minsk National Airport. Upon landing, the Belarusian KGB arrested two of the passengers, opposition activist Roman Protasevich and his girlfriend Sofia Sapega. The other passengers were allowed to reboard the plane to depart for Vilnius after seven hours.

See also
List of the busiest airports in the former USSR

References

External links

Airports built in the Soviet Union
Airports in Belarus
Transport in Minsk